Monika Maliczkiewicz (born 15 April 1988) is a Polish handballer for Metraco Zagłębie Lubin and the Polish national team.

She participated at the 2021 World Women's Handball Championship in Spain, placing 15th.

Achievements
Ekstraklasa:
Winner: 2009, 2010, 2013, 2014, 2015, 2018, 2019, 2020
Puchar Polski:
Finalist: 2010, 2012, 2018
EHF Challenge Cup:
Winner: 2018

References

External links

1988 births
Living people
People from Wrocław
Polish female handball players
21st-century Polish women